José Benito Paz Falcón (c. 1800 – c. 1860) was one of five interim mayors of Ponce, Puerto Rico, during the period of 14 February 1854 to 24 July 1854.  The other four interim mayors during that six-month period were Julio Duboc, Escolástico Fuentes, Pablo Manfredi, and Antonio E. Molina.

Introduction to politics
In 1820, Paz Falcón had been part of the Ponce ayuntamiento under mayor Ortiz de la Renta where he performed as one of two Sindico procurador, some 34 years before he became mayor himself. In 1822, he was elected to serve as Diputado provincial (provincial representative).

See also

 List of Puerto Ricans
 List of mayors of Ponce, Puerto Rico

References

Mayors of Ponce, Puerto Rico
1800s births
1860s deaths
Year of birth uncertain
Year of death uncertain